Les Mystères du Nautilus (French for "The Mysteries of the Nautilus") is a walkthrough attraction at Disneyland Paris in France. It is an updated version of the 20,000 Leagues Under the Sea walkthrough attraction that was at Disneyland in Anaheim, CA in the early 1950s, based upon the film of the same name.
This attraction takes guests throughout the various rooms of Captain Nemo's submarine, especially those seen in the film. It opened on 4 July 1994.

Summary

The submarine is located in a lagoon near Star Wars Hyperspace Mountain. Guests enter what looks like a lighthouse, and proceed into the attraction through an underwater corridor. Although guests may believe they are visiting the submarine seen in the lagoon, the 'underwater tunnel' leads them into a show building hidden by tall green bushes. The winding staircase into the attraction helps to disorient guests so they do not realise this.

Six rooms are visited inside the Nautilus:
 The Ballasts Compartment: This is a dimly lit room, with an open safe at the center. Inside the safe is the treasure Captain Nemo has gathered from his many underwater explorations. Ned Land's guitar from the movie is visible among the coins.
 Captain Nemo's Room: This cabin, complete with a bed and a bathroom, allows guests to have a look at the Captain's belongings and his collections of books and paintings. A mirror is displayed on the organ and guests can sometimes witness Nemo's reflection. A recreation of James Mason's face is actually hidden behind the glass. When lit, it becomes visible.
 The Charts Room: This room is the hub of the Nautilus, with staircases ascending to the wheelhouse and the main deck above (although these cannot be visited). Several charts are displayed, including one representing Vulcania Island, Nemo's lair in the movie.
 The Diving Chamber: In the center of this small chamber is a trap door leading to the bottom of the ocean underneath. Diving suits stand along the wall.
 The Main Salon: This is the heart of the Nautilus. Books, artifacts, and numerous treasures of the sea are gathered here. The Captain's organ stands on the far side and guests can see Nemo's reflection when staring at the mirror just above the keys. One window opens on the ocean's depths and allows guests to witness the attack of the giant squid. As it approaches, one can see its beak reach for the submarine. The creature is later repulsed by an electric zap. This squid is an animatronic in a dark room that gives the illusion of being the ocean. The flooded double-glass window with air bubbles, together with water-ripple lights projected onto the squid, creates a realistic effect.
 The Engine Room: The last room to be visited. Machines and engines powering the propellers can be found here, along with the power unit on the opposite wall. The scene also showcases smoke effects.

Design

Originally, a larger version of this walkthrough was intended, with more rooms and even an underwater restaurant. It was to be part of the never-built Discovery Mountain project, which was shelved when Disneyland Paris underwent financial troubles.

The squid attack was more developed in 1994. It began with the organ playing Johann Sebastian Bach'sToccata & Fugue in D Minor, and with Nemo's short speech about his ocean kingdom. Then, the window opened for guests to witness the ocean depths, until a giant tentacle hit the glass. Captain Nemo ordered the window to close, and tried to free the submarine from the squid's grip. Yet, bursts of water from the ceiling reached the audience, and the engines eventually broke down. Finally, as the window reopened, guests could see the whole monster. Electric zaps struck it, but it would not unleash the submarine until zaps got stronger. Due to technical problems, this scene was shortened.

Disney Imagineer Tom Sherman, who created many sketches and designed Nautilus models, was awarded the name of "Admiral of the Nautilus" before the opening. Tim Delaney stated it was, for him, "a dream come true."

The attraction is also present at Tokyo DisneySea. However, it is merely a decorative exterior piece that is on display, lacking the interior counterpart seen at Disneyland Paris. The area is now used as a meet-and-greet spot with Mickey, Minnie, Donald and Daisy in steampunk costumes.

See also

 Jules Verne
 Twenty Thousand Leagues Under the Sea
 20,000 Leagues Under the Sea (1954 film)
 The Nautilus
 Captain Nemo
 Discoveryland
 Space Mountain

References

Amusement rides introduced in 1994
Walt Disney Parks and Resorts attractions
Mysteres du Nautilus
Tomorrowland
Audio-Animatronic attractions
Works based on Twenty Thousand Leagues Under the Sea
1994 establishments in France
Amusement rides based on works by Jules Verne